Data Guard or data guard may refer to:

 Guard (information security) - a security mechanism for computers on separate networks
 Oracle Data Guard - software for replicating Oracle databases